The situation for women in the Byzantine Empire is a matter of debate. For a long time, the attention of historians was attracted only by individual prominent Byzantine women, mainly the Empress, especially the wife of Emperor Justinian I Theodora, who had a significant influence on the events of the first half of the 6th century. Numerous sources (chronicles, legal texts, hagiographic literature) however paint a picture of the Byzantine patriarchal society in which women in general did not have independent significance and were imprisoned in a gynaeceum. 

The scientific study of the legal and economic status of women in the Byzantine Empire began in the second half of the 19th century and is currently intensively ongoing. The subject of study is both women in general and related issues of family and property law. The scarcity of surviving sources leads to diverse assessments of the place of women in Byzantine society. With the development of gender studies in the 1970s, there is a tendency to revise early views, according to which this role was not significant. The historian Ioili Kalavrezou provides a more positive description of the lives of Byzantine women. Several authors today assume that Byzantine women enjoyed significantly more privileges in comparison to women in Western Europe as well as in the Islamic world.

Education
There were individual Byzantine women famed for their educational accomplishments, such as Kassia, Anna Komnene and Dobrodeia of Kiev.  However, the general view of women's education was that it was sufficient for a girl to learn domestic duties and to study the lives of the Christian saints and memorize psalms,  and to learn to read so that she could study Bible scriptures – though literacy among women was sometimes discouraged because it was believed it could encourage vice.

Sexuality

Marriage
The Roman right to actual divorce was gradually erased after the introduction of Christianity and replaced with legal separation and annulation.  In the Byzantine Empire marriage was regarded as the ideal state for a woman, and only convent life was seen as a legitimate alternative.  Within marriage, sexual activity was regarded only as the means of reproduction.  A woman had the right to appear before court, but her testimony was not regarded as equal to that of a man, and could be contradicted on the basis of her sex if put against that of a man. On the other hand, women were not entirely subordinated to the will of men. According to the Early Byzantine diplomat and political thinker Priscus of Pannion, '[a]mongst the Romans it was not right to betroth a woman to a man against her will'. Theodore of Sykeon in his Life 'depicts a household of strong women, with no male head, who converge to spoil and promote the one young male child in the family. The women have some choice in their lives, they are able to make a living through the proceeds of the inn, and later, Theodore's grandmother chooses the religious life while his mother marries into a prominent family.'

Ascetic ideal of a woman 
According to Judith Herrin, sexuality in the Byzantine Empire was saturated with hypocritical double standards, as in any other medieval society. On the one hand, men appreciated female charm and resorted to the services of prostitutes and mistresses, on the other hand, demanded moral purity from their relatives. Moreover, in Byzantium, the Christian church played a huge role, whose ideas about the relationship of the sexes were formed in the period Early Christianity. Christianity has inherited beliefs from Classical antiquity that women are physically and morally weaker than men, more prone to the needs and desires of their bodies, and therefore less able to understand what is good, and if they understand, to adhere to it. Finally with rare exceptions, Byzantine literature was created by men and reflects their views. 

Until the 12th century, in the Byzantine Empire there was no erotic literature and erotic art in general, and the subject of expression of feelings was the attitude of ascetic to God, which implied the complete elimination of sexuality. According to the general idea, a woman was responsible for the desire arising to her in a man, and even for a monk, the best way was not to look at women. There was no general consensus on whether disgusting sexual desire is always dangerous. Some Christian authors of the 4th century agreed that the desire was given by God for the purpose of procreation, and a married person can lead a Christian life no less than one who adheres to celibacy. Some believed that a chaste man and woman could live in the same house without risk to their souls, however, the practical experience of ascetics indicated that sexual desire was almost impossible to contain. In this sense, even a mother or sister could become a reminder to the ascetic of all the other women and the rejected worldly life in general. In this regard, for an ascetic woman, it was necessary to abandon an attractive appearance, wear clothes hiding the figure, and abandon her social status. The washing was condemned, as it once again attracted attention to the rejected body.

Prostitution 

The prostitutes were at the bottom of the social ladder and were known by a variety of names – hetairai, "public women", "(women) from the attic". They are more known from hagiographic literature (where they appear under the designation "humiliated" or "miserable") or in civil or church law attempting to limit this phenomenon. Probably, prostitution has always been prevalent in Byzantium. However, the word  referred not only to communication with prostitutes, but to many other deviations from the recommended sexual behavior. Prostitution flourished in the capital and the largest cities of the empire – Alexandria, Antioch, Beirut and Edessa, later in Thessaloniki and ports of Asia Minor. 

Engaging in this activity was relatively voluntary when the daughters of actors or artisans were seduced by tales spread by the brothel holders about the luxurious life of getters; also prostitutes could become slaves and prisoners. Mistresses of brothels also went to the provinces to find suitable girls, buying them in poor families. However, such transactions were illegal, and the found father of the family was deprived of parental rights and could be sent as a punishment to the mines; for the members of the Church, the punishment was excommunication. But, obviously, these measures were applied without much success, and at least in the 12th century, prostitution was not only voluntary. Attempts to limit prostitution geographically were also futile even in Constantinople – founded even under Constantine the Great Lupanar was empty, and under the emperor Theophilos (829–843) the building was transferred to the hospital.

Women whose activities involved the trading of their bodies also included mime artists, performers on flute, and singers at weddings or banquets. According to the Byzantines, engaging in secular art is not befitting an honest man, and women of these professions were considered prostitutes of a separate kind. The lower class prostitutes were considered to be maidservants in taverns and xenodochiums, about which, according to the tradition dating from ancient times.

A frequent topos of Byzantine hagiographic literature was the spiritual degeneration of the “harlot," who, repenting, "acquired holiness for herself." So, for example, this happened with a saint of the 5th century Pelagia of Antioch or a saint of the 6th century Mary of Egypt. According to the suggestion of Judith Herrin, the mother of Constantine the Great Saint Helena was a prostitute in the tavern.

Public role

Gender segregation

From the 6th century there was a growing ideal of gender segregation, which dictated that women should wear veils and only be seen in public when attending church, and while the ideal was never fully enforced, it influenced society.  The laws of emperor Justinian I made it legal for a man to divorce his wife for attending public premises—such as theatres or public baths—without his permission, and Emperor Leo VI banned women from witnessing business contracts with the argument that it caused them to come into contact with men.  In Constantinople, upper class women were increasingly expected to keep to a special women's section (gynaikonitis), and by the 8th century it was described as unacceptable for unmarried daughters to meet unrelated men.  While imperial women and their ladies appeared in public alongside men, women and men at the Imperial Court attended royal banquets separately until the rise of the Comnenus dynasty in the 12th century. According to the Byzantinist Averil Cameron, '[t]he message of the prevailing ideology' in Byzantium 'was that women should stay at home, be good mothers and confine their acticity to acts of pious charity. Yet the reality was somewhat different. For example, women could inherit, the dowry system was a protection for them ... Many non-aristocratic women also found ways of exercising influence outside the home, and at lower levels, as in all agrarian societies, and in pre-industrial towns generally, their labour was essential.'

Economy and professional life

Eastern Roman and later Byzantine women retained the Roman woman's right to inherit, own, and manage their property and sign contracts, rights which were far superior to the rights of married women in Medieval Catholic Western Europe, as these rights included not only unmarried women and widows, but married women as well.  Women's legal right to handle their own money made it possible for rich women to engage in business, however, women who actively had to find a profession to support themselves normally worked as domestics or in domestic fields such as the food or textile industries.  Women could work as medical physicians and attendants of women patients and visitors at hospitals and public baths with government support. 

After the introduction of Christianity, women could no longer become priestesses, but it became common for women to found and manage nunneries, which functioned as schools for girls as well as asylums, poor houses, hospitals, prisons and retirement homes for women, and many Byzantine women practiced social work as lay sisters and deaconesses.

Political participation 

The Byzantine Empire was a monarchy, and as in many other monarchies, the royal system allowed for women to participate in politics as monarchs in their own name or as regents in place of a husband or son. Many royal women are known to have participated in politics during the centuries. Among them were female monarchs like Pulcheria, Irene of Athens and Theodora Porphyrogenita, as well as female regents such as Theodora, Theophano and Eudokia Makrembolitissa. There were also empresses who acted as political advisors of their husbands, most famously Theodora (wife of Justinian I). The royal system allowed for women to participate in politics because they were royal, but this was reserved for royal women and did not apply to women in general, nor did it signify acceptance for female participation in politics as such. At the time Irene of Athens was a sole Empress, Pope Leo III considered Irene's alleged unprecedented status as a female ruler of the Roman Empire and proclaimed Charlemagne emperor of the Holy Roman Empire on Christmas Day of 800. He assumed that a woman could not rule and so the throne of the Roman Empire was actually vacant.

In regard to the historiography of women's policial activity in the Byzantine Empire, there are two main points of view. According to one of them, women were isolated from the rest of society in a gynaeceum. In this case, historians refer to the relevant statements of Michael Psellos, Kekaumenos and Michael Attaleiates. Another point of view, more common at the present time, is that the isolation of women in the sources does not reflect the real state of affairs, but the ideal idea of Byzantine men. Since the 12th century, numerous examples of the opposite have been known.  Talking about how her mother accompanied Alexios I on campaigns, Anna Komnene, the first female historian of Europe, speaks not only about how she took care of the emperor’s sore legs, but also was his adviser, who helped identify the conspirators. According to the writer, "these were the reasons that overpowered the natural shame of this woman and gave her the courage to appear before the eyes of men".  The wife of Emperor John VI, Irene Asanina, ruled the city of Didymoteicho during the absence of her husband during the second civil war (1341–1347). Their daughter Maria ruled the fortress of Enez a few years later, in place of her husband Nikephoros, who was the Despotate of Epirus.

According to Angeliki Laiou, the role of Byzantine women in the political life of the country was significant in the late period of its history in connection with the consolidation of the aristocracy, whose position became dominant. Within this ruling class, women were important because they possessed significant property and had influence over their children. The importance of family ties in the Komnenos period was noted by the Soviet-American Byzantinist Alexander Kazhdan.

References

Citations

Bibliography
 in English
 
 
 
 
 
 
 
 
 
 
 
 

 in German
 

 in French
 
 
 

Византия